Giovanni Bonanno (born 9 September 1968) is an Italian former racing driver.

References

1968 births
Living people
Italian racing drivers
International Formula 3000 drivers
Place of birth missing (living people)